KF Luzi i Vogël 2008 is an Albanian football (soccer) club based in Luz i Vogël, Kavajë. The club was founded in 2008 and is currently competing in Kategoria e Parë which is the 2nd tier of Albanian football. During the club's first ever season they managed a respectable 4th-place finish (in the Second Category).

History
Luzi United played its first ever competitive game against KF Erzeni in the Second Division Group A on 21 September 2008. The match itself was not a great moment in the club's history as they lost 2–0 away from home. The next two games in the season were also away from home which meant that Luzi would not earn a single point in the first four games of the season. The team had to wait until their first home game for their first ever point and goal. This came on 2 November 2008 against KF Adriatiku Mamurrasi. The match ended 1–0 in favor of Luzi which was enough to seal the win.

It was announced on 8 October 2009 that legendary national team player Altin Rraklli would be joining the club as technical director.

By far the biggest game in the club's history was the Albanian Cup first round encounter with the champions of Albania KF Tirana on 21 October 2009. The match was played at a sold out and very festive Luz i Vogël Stadium. Tirana took the lead in the 14th minute through national team midfielder Jetmir Sefa, but Luzi quickly fought back to equalise just 2 minutes later with Bejko. Luzi then went on to dominate and grab another two goals with Fagu in the 42nd and then Gega in the 62nd minute.

Stadium
The club currently play at the purpose built Stadiumi Luz i Vogël 2008 in Luz i Vogël. The stadium was built in 2008 by the Luz i Vogël council and was paid for by them. The stadium currently holds 600 supporters and is an all seater. The playing surface is all natural grass. However, the stadium does not have a disabled area or even a professional camera system in place. KS Besa Kavajë have also used the stadium for friendly and cup games, the first was an Albanian Cup encounter against KS Kastrioti Krujë on 17 December 2008.

Investment
In November 2008, the president of the club Lavdim Lusha and two of his brothers from the small town of Luz i Vogël made clear their ambitions of investing up to 400,000 euros into the club's stadium. The three brothers Lavdim, Sokoli and Albert Lusha made the news public at an AFA event in the town which was attended by both the presidents of Teuta Durrës and Besa Kavajë.

Renovation
Renovation on the stadium began in 2013 following the end of the 2012–13 season, and was completed in March 2014, in time for the club's home game against FK Vora. The club played their home games in Rrogozhinë at the stadium of KS Egnatia while the renovation took place, which included the reconstruction of the pitch. In the inauguration led by the club's joint presidents and brothers Lavdrim and Albert Lusha, the president of the Albanian Football Association Armand Duka was invited.

Statistics

Matches

 First competitive match: KF Erzeni 2–0 KF Luz i Vogël 2008, Kategoria e dytë, 21 September 2008
 First Albanian Cup match: KF Luz i Vogël 2008 2–1 KF Çlirimi, Second Preliminary Round, 30 September 2009
 First match at Stadiumi Luz i Vogël 2008: KF Luz i Vogël 2008 1–0 KF Adriatiku Mamurrasi, 2 November 2008

Record wins

 Record win: 7–1 v KS Korabi Peshkopi, Kategoria e dytë, 11 April 2009
 Record Albanian Cup win: 3–1 v KF Tirana, 21 October 2009
 Record away win: 2–0 v KF Naftëtari Kuçovë, Kategoria e dytë, 20 September 2009

Current squad

See also
 Besa Kavajë
 Golemi FC
 FK Egnatia

References

Football clubs in Kavajë
Football clubs in Albania
2008 establishments in Albania
Association football clubs established in 2008
Kategoria e Dytë clubs